Vitória Frate Paranhos (born 20 May 1986) is a Brazilian film, television and theater actress.

She graduated in Performing Arts, in Rio, Vitoria Frate began her acting career in theater in plays such as Nenhuma Palavra, De Para and Um Amor de Circo, among others.

She made her feature film debut in Once Upon a Time in Rio.

She became famous in the rebellious character of Júlia Cadore in the television series India – A Love Story broadcast on Rede Globo channel.

Awards and nominations
In 2008, she was nominated for "Most Promising Actress" during Prêmio Qualidade awards in Brazil for her role in Once Upon a Time in Rio as Nina.
In 2009, she was nominated for "Most Promising Actress - Television" during Prêmio Qualidade awards in Brazil.

Personal life
She is the daughter of TV film director Diléa Frate. Her sister Ana Markun is also an actress.

Filmography
Once Upon a Time in Rio as Nina (2008)
Léo e Bia as Cachorrinha (2010)

Television
India – A Love Story as Júlia Cadore (2009)
Bicicleta e Melancia as Diana (2010)
Bicicleta e Melancia 2 as Diana (2011)
Sangue Oculto as young Vanda (2022)

Theater
Nenhuma Palavra
De Para
Um Amor de Circo
Estragaram todos os meus sonhos, seus cães miseráveis! (2010)			
Alguém acaba de morrer lá fora (2011)

References

External links

1986 births
Living people